Founded in 1952, Norfolk Christian Schools (NCS) is a private, coeducational Christian day school serving Grades K3 through 12. The school is recognized by the Virginia State Board of Education as an accredited school and is accredited by the Virginia Association of Independent Schools, and Southern Association of Colleges and Schools. The school's three campuses (two in Norfolk and one in Virginia Beach) serve the major Hampton Roads cities of Norfolk, Virginia Beach, Chesapeake, Portsmouth, and Suffolk. Athletically, Norfolk Christian is a member of the Tidewater Conference of Independent Schools and the Virginia Independent Schools Athletic Association.

References

Christian schools in Virginia
Schools in Norfolk, Virginia
Schools in Virginia Beach, Virginia
Educational institutions established in 1952
Private K-12 schools in Virginia
1952 establishments in Virginia